Northern Islands High School (NIHS) is a secondary school in Wotje, Marshall Islands. It is a part of the Marshall Islands Public School System.

The school serves the following atolls and islands in the north of the country: Wotje, Ailuk, Aur, Likiep, Maloelap, Mejit, and Utrik.

It has a boarding program for students from distant atolls and islands.

History
Anil Construction built the building. The construction plans were finalized in 1991. The school was scheduled to open in 1998.

References

Boarding schools
High schools in the Marshall Islands
Educational institutions established in 1998